Hercules A is a bright astronomical radio source within the vicinity of the constellation Hercules corresponding to the galaxy 3C 348.

Observation

During a survey of bright radio sources in the mid-20th century, astronomers found a very bright radio source in the constellation Hercules. The radio source is strongest in the middle range frequency and emits synchrotron radiation, suggesting the source of radio emission may be gravitational interaction. In 1959, astronomers from the Radio Astronomy Group (later the Cavendish Astrophysics Group) detected the radio source using the Cambridge Interferometer of the Cavendish Observatory in Cambridge University in United Kingdom, including it in the Third Cambridge Catalogue of Radio Sources (3C) as 3C 348, the 348th object detected by the survey.

Characteristics

Galaxy

The galaxy, 3C 348, is a supergiant elliptical galaxy. It is classified as type E3 to E4 of the updated Hubble–de Vaucouleurs extended galaxy morphological classification scheme. Little else is known about the galaxy.

3C 348, the galaxy at the image center, appears to be a relatively normal elliptical galaxy in visible light. When imaged in radio waves, however, plasma jets over one million light years long appear. Detailed analyses indicate that the galaxy is actually over 1,000 times more massive (approx. 10 solar masses) than our Milky Way Galaxy, and the central black hole is nearly 1,000 times more massive (approx. 4 billion solar masses) than the black hole at our Milky Way's center, one of the largest known. The physics that creates the jets are poorly understood, with a likely energy source being matter ejected perpendicular to the accretion disc of the central black hole.

See also
 List of largest galaxies

References

Active galaxies
Hercules (constellation)
Elliptical galaxies